Cyclophora lowi is a moth in the family Geometridae. It is found on Borneo. The habitat consists of upper montane forests.

The length of the forewings is 13–15 mm. Adults are uniform brick red with faint fasciation.

References

Moths described in 1997
Cyclophora (moth)
Moths of Borneo